Ectoedemia amani is a moth of the family Nepticulidae. It is found in southern Norway, southern Sweden, Denmark (Bornholm and Falster), Austria (Vienna region), and Macedonia.

The wingspan is 7.8-9.8 mm. Adults have been caught in June and July.

The larvae feed on Ulmus species. Unlike most other Nepticulidae species, the larvae mine the bark of their host, rather than the leaves. The mine consists of a long contorted gallery in smooth bark of rather thin branches.

External links
Fauna Europaea
A Taxonomic Revision Of The Western Palaearctic Species Of The Subgenera Zimmermannia Hering And Ectoedemia Busck s.str. (Lepidoptera, Nepticulidae), With Notes On Their Phylogeny

Nepticulidae
Moths of Europe
Moths described in 1966